Newport Airport may refer to:

 Newport Municipal Airport (Arkansas) in Newport, Arkansas, United States
 Newport Municipal Airport (Oregon) in Newport, Oregon, United States
 Newport State Airport (Rhode Island) in Middletown (near Newport), Rhode Island, United States
 Newport State Airport (Vermont) in Newport, Vermont, United States
 Parlin Field in Newport, New Hampshire, United States

See also 
 Newport Municipal Airport (disambiguation)
 Newport State Airport (disambiguation)